Chariesterus antennator, the euphorbia bug, is a species of leaf-footed bug in the family Coreidae. It is found in North America and China. Adults feed on Euphorbia corollata.

References

External links

 

Articles created by Qbugbot
Insects described in 1803
Chariesterini
Hemiptera of North America
Hemiptera of Asia
Insects of China